Karim Fellahi (born 31 October 1974) is a French former professional footballer who played as a midfielder.

References

External links
 
 
 

Living people
1974 births
Sportspeople from Épinay-sur-Seine
Association football midfielders
Algerian footballers
Algeria international footballers
French sportspeople of Algerian descent
Red Star F.C. players
AS Saint-Étienne players
G.D. Estoril Praia players
Royal Excel Mouscron players
R.W.D.M. Brussels F.C. players
UJA Maccabi Paris Métropole players
Belgian Pro League players
Ligue 1 players
Ligue 2 players
Primeira Liga players
Algerian expatriate sportspeople in Belgium
Algerian expatriate footballers
Expatriate footballers in Portugal
Algerian expatriate sportspeople in Portugal
Footballers from Seine-Saint-Denis